The 2006 Irish Greyhound Derby took place during August and September with the final being held at Shelbourne Park in Dublin on 9 September 2006.

The winner Razldazl Billy won €175,000 and was trained by Dolores Ruth, owned by Liam Marks and bred by Tommy Holden, whelped down by Michael Power and reared by Shirley Ruth. The race was sponsored by the Paddy Power.

Final result 
At Shelbourne, 9 September (over 550 yards):

Distances 
5¼, 1¾, short-head, ¾, ¾ (lengths)

Competition Report
Double English Greyhound Derby champion Westmead Hawk was unable to travel to Ireland for the 2007 Irish Derby, which meant the ante-post betting was headed by Droopys Electric.

The defending champion He Said So who had been resting for 322 days, returned to action by winning his preliminary round heat in 29.74. Droopys Electric and Bar The Devil were also winners. In the first round He Said So claimed another win in 29.90 but ante-post favourite Droopys Electric was eliminated and Champion Stakes winner Large Me was knocked over and knocked out. Leading winning times were Si Senor (29.71), Goldstar Lee (29.79) and Bar The Devil (29.79).

Si Senor produced a fast run of 29.57 in round two and was installed as the new favourite, but He Said So won again in 29.59 and a new prefix of Razldazl (named after the musical Chicago), first came to light when Razldazl Billy won his second round race. Bar The Devil remained unbeaten after a quarter final success but Si Senor was eliminated. Ardkill Jamie and Skywalker Magic took the remaining two heats one of which contained He Said So who kept his dreams alive of a famous double by recovering well after trouble.

Razldazl Billy won the first semi-final from Antrim Classic and Bar the Devil, 4-7 favourite He Said So missed the break and the chance to defend his title in the final had gone. The concluding semi-final ended with a win for 10-1 shot Barefoot Jenny leading home Trey United and Skywalker Magic.

In the final Razldazl Billy recorded 29.49 and eased to a six length victory. The favourite Bar The Devil had clashed on the first bend with Antrim Classic, the latter running very well to get up for second place.

Quarter finals

Semi finals

See also
2006 UK & Ireland Greyhound Racing Year

References

Greyhound Derby
Irish Greyhound Derby
Irish Greyhound Derby